Dalchonzie is a place by the river Earn in Perthshire.  Buildings there include a country house, a hydro-electric power station and farms.
From 1903 to 1951 Dalchonzie Halt railway station served this rural area. The old signal box at the station still survives as part of a private dwelling.

References

Country houses in Perth and Kinross